The Khazar Lankaran 2006–07 season was Khazar Lankaran's second Azerbaijan Premier League season. It was their first season under the management of Agaselim Mirjavadov. They completed a League and Cup double, winning both competitions for the first time.

Squad

Transfers

Summer

In:

Out:

Winter

In:

Out:

Competitions

Azerbaijan Premier League

Results
Source:

Table

Azerbaijan Cup

Source:

Final

Squad statistics

Appearances and goals

|-
|colspan="14"|Players who appeared for Khazar Lankaran who left during the season:

|}

Goal scorers

Notes
Qarabağ have played their home games at the Tofiq Bahramov Stadium since 1993 due to the ongoing situation in Quzanlı.

References

Cup Results

External links 
 Khazar Lankaran at Soccerway.com

Khazar Lankaran FK seasons
Khazar Lankaran